District 19 of the Texas Senate is a senatorial district that currently serves all of Brewster, Crockett, Dimmitt, Edwards, Frio, Kinney, Maverick, Medina, Pecos, Real, Reeves, Terrell, Uvalde, Val Verde, Zavala counties, and portions of Bexar and Atascosa counties in the U.S. state of Texas. The district is currently served by Democrat Roland Gutierrez.

District 19 is one of the largest legislative districts in the United States, containing all or part of 17 counties and covering more than 35,000 square miles and about 400 miles of the Texas-Mexico border. The district contains 55 public school districts, more than 23,000 oil and gas wells, 10 state parks, three national parks, and more than 2,700 miles of highways and interstate transportation infrastructure. Redistricting in 2010 led to District 19 losing several western counties and gaining several eastern ones.  The district is 66% Hispanic.

Top 5 biggest cities in district
District 19 has a population of 800,501 with 566,604 that is at voting age from the 2010 census.

Election history
Election history of District 20 from 1992.

Previous elections

2020

2018

2016

2012

2010

2006

2002

1998

1994

1992

District officeholders

Notes

References

19
Atascosa County, Texas
Bexar County, Texas
Brewster County, Texas
Crockett County, Texas
Dimmit County, Texas
Edwards County, Texas
Frio County, Texas
Kinney County, Texas
Maverick County, Texas
Medina County, Texas
Pecos County, Texas
Real County, Texas
Reeves County, Texas
Terrell County, Texas
Uvalde County, Texas
Val Verde County, Texas
Zavala County, Texas